Indian Saudis or Indo-Saudis are Saudis of Indian origin. They consist mainly of the descendants of Hajj pilgrims who hailed from the territories of Mughal, British, modern India or Pakistan and settled in Hejaz before or after the establishment of Saudi Arabia, immigrants and residents who were naturalized prior to the revocation of jus soli citizenship rights and children born to Saudi fathers under the jus sanguinis principle. Most Indo-Saudis adhere to Islam and speak Arabic and Urdu.

Notable Indo-Saudis 

 Abu Turab al-Zahiri, theologian and jurist
 Ziaur Rahman Azmi, theologian and scholar
Muhammad Mustafa Azmi, scholar
 Abdulbasit Hindi, footballer

See also
 Pakistanis in Saudi Arabia

References  

Saudi Arabian people of Indian descent
Saudi Arabia